The 2007 Women's Hockey Champions Challenge I was the 4th edition of the Champions Challenge I for women.

China won the tournament for the first time, defeating South Korea 2–1 in the final.

Teams
Alongside the host nation, 5 teams competed in the tournament. 

  (host nation)

Results

Preliminary round

Classification round

Fifth and sixth place

Third and fourth place

Final

Statistics

Final standings

References

Women's Hockey Champions Challenge I
Champions Challenge
Hockey Champions Challenge Women
International women's field hockey competitions hosted by Azerbaijan
Hockey Champions Challenge
Sports competitions in Baku
2000s in Baku